Christopher Francis D'Elia is an American marine scientist and biologist, known for his research on nutrient pollution by nitrogen. He is currently Dean and Professor at Louisiana State University College of the Coast and Environment and since 1992 has been an Elected Fellow of the American Association for the Advancement of Science.

D'Elia holds a bachelor's degree from Middlebury College and a Ph.D. from the University of Georgia. In 1989 he joined the University of Maryland faculty where he was director of the Sea Grant program and president of the Sea Grant Association. He led the Coastal and Estuarine Research Federation from 1991 to 1993, and in 1999 moved to the University of Albany as vice president of research. He later worked at the University of South Florida St. Petersburg where in 2007 D'Elia was appointed regional vice chancellor of students affairs and was in charge of all academic programs and stayed until 2009 when he joined the faculty at Louisiana State University.

In 2014 the University of Georgia Graduate School gave D'Elia their Alumni of Distinction Award.

References

External links
 Faculty website

Fellows of the American Association for the Advancement of Science
Louisiana State University faculty
Middlebury College alumni
University of Georgia alumni
Living people
21st-century American biologists
Year of birth missing (living people)